Tura Satana (July 10, 1938 – February 4, 2011) was a Japanese American actress, vedette, and exotic dancer. From 13 film and television credits, some of her work includes the exploitation film Faster, Pussycat! Kill! Kill! (1965), and the science fiction horror film The Astro-Zombies (1968).

Early life 
Satana was born Tura Luna Pascual Yamaguchi in Hokkaidō, Japan. Her father was a Japanese silent movie actor of Filipino descent, and her mother was a circus performer of Native American (Cheyenne) and Scots-Irish background. After the end of World War II and a stint in the Manzanar internment camp in Lone Pine, California, Tura and her family moved to Chicago.

Walking home from school just before her 10th birthday, she was reportedly gang raped by five men. According to Satana, her attackers were never prosecuted, and it was rumored that the judge had been paid off. She reports that this prompted her to learn martial arts, such as aikido and karate. Over the next 15 years, Satana tracked down each rapist and exacted revenge. "I made a vow to myself that I would someday, somehow get even with all of them," she said years later. "They never knew who I was until I told them." Around this time, she formed a gang, "the Angeles," with Italian, Jewish, and Polish girls from her neighborhood. In an interview with Psychotronic Video,  Satana said, "We had leather motorcycle jackets, jeans and boots...and we kicked butt." Because of frequent delinquency, she was sent to reform school. When she was 13, her parents arranged her marriage to 17-year-old John Satana in Hernando, Mississippi, which lasted nine months.

Satana moved to Los Angeles and by age 15, using fake identification to hide the fact she was a minor, began burlesque dancing. She was hired to perform at the Trocadero nightclub on the Sunset Strip, and became a photographic model for, among others, silent screen comic Harold Lloyd, whose photos of her appear in Harold Lloyd's Hollywood Nudes in 3-D.

Satana returned to Chicago to live with her parents and started dancing at the Club Rendevouz in Calumet City, where she was known as Galatea, the "Statue that Came to Life." She was offered a raise to become a stripper.   She claimed that after singer Elvis Presley saw Satana perform at Chicago's Follies Theater, the two began a romantic relationship that some reports say ended in a marriage proposal she declined. Satana eventually became a successful exotic dancer, traveling from city to city. She credited Lloyd with giving her the confidence to pursue a career in show business: "I saw myself as an ugly child. Mr. Lloyd said, 'You have such a symmetrical face. The camera loves your face...You should be seen.'"

Acting career 
Satana's acting debut role was a cameo as Suzette Wong, a Parisian prostitute in the film Irma la Douce, which starred Jack Lemmon and Shirley MacLaine. Her next was as a dancer in Who's Been Sleeping in My Bed? (1963), which starred Dean Martin and Elizabeth Montgomery. Soon after, Satana appeared in the television shows Burke's Law (1964) and The Man from U.N.C.L.E. (1964).

Satana then starred as "Varla" in the 1965 film Faster, Pussycat! Kill! Kill!—a very aggressive and sexual female character for which she did all of her own stunts and fight scenes. Renowned film critic Richard Corliss called her performance "the most honest, maybe the one honest portrayal in the Meyer canon and certainly the scariest." Originally titled The Leather Girls, the film is an ode to female violence, based on a concept created by Russ Meyer and screenwriter Jack Moran. Both felt at her first audition that Satana was "definitely Varla." The film was shot on location in the desert outside Los Angeles during days when the weather was more than 100 degrees Fahrenheit and freezing nights, with Satana clashing regularly with teenage co-star Susan Bernard due to Bernard's mother's reportedly disruptive behavior on the set. Meyer said Satana was "extremely capable. She knew how to handle herself. Don't fuck with her! And if you have to fuck her, do it well! She might turn on you!"

Satana was responsible for adding key elements to the visual style and energy of the production, including her costume, makeup, usage of martial arts, dialogue and the use of spinning tires in the death scene of the main male character. She came up with many of the film's best lines. At one point in the film, the gas station attendant was ogling her cleavage while confessing to a desire to see America. Varla replied "You won't find it down there, Columbus!" Meyer cited her as the primary reason for the film's lasting fame. "She and I made the movie", he said. Meyer reportedly later regretted not using Satana in subsequent productions.

After Faster, Pussycat! Kill! Kill!, Satana primarily worked with film director Ted V. Mikels in such films as The Astro-Zombies (1968), and The Doll Squad (1973). After making Mikels' The Doll Squad in 1973, Satana was shot by a former lover. She later found employment in a hospital, a position she kept for four years. She had studied nursing at Firmin Desloge Hospital. She was then briefly employed as a dispatcher for the Los Angeles Police Department. In 1981, her back was broken in a car accident. She spent the next two years in and out of hospitals, having two major operations and approximately fifteen others.

In 2002, she returned to acting, reprising the role of Malvina Satana in Mark of the Astro Zombies (2002), the sequel to The Astro Zombies.

Personal life 
Satana claims to have dated Elvis Presley but turned down his marriage proposal, although she kept the ring.

Death 
Satana died on February 4, 2011, in Reno, Nevada, and was survived by her daughters, Kalani and Jade, and her sisters, Pamela and Kim. Her long-time manager, Siouxzan Perry, gave the cause of death as heart failure.

Selected filmography 
 Irma la Douce (1963) – Suzette Wong
 Who's Been Sleeping in My Bed? (1963) – Stripper (uncredited)
 Faster, Pussycat! Kill! Kill! (1965) – Varla
 Our Man Flint (1966) – Stripper (uncredited)
 The Astro-Zombies (1968) – Satana
 The Doll Squad (1973) – Lavelle Sumara
 Mark of the Astro-Zombies (2002) – Malvira Satana
 The Wild World of Ted V. Mikels (2008) – Herself
 Sugar Boxx (2009) – Judge #1
 The Haunted World of El Superbeasto (2009) – Varla (voice)
 Astro Zombies: M3 – Cloned (2010) – Malvina (final film role)

Tributes 
 The alternative metal band Tura Satana is named after her.
 The Argentine rock band Babasónicos created a song honoring her, titled Viva Satana!, from their 1996 album Dopádromo.
 "Song For Tura Satana" is the sixteenth track on Zopilote Machine by The Mountain Goats.
 Australian punk-pop band Ratcat had a B-side called Tura Satana in 1989.
 Seattle industrial band Kill Switch...Klick released a four-song EP in 2008 featuring Super Amanda on vocals performing four different mixes of the Tura Satana Tribute song, Hemi Charger.
 Las Vegas burlesque performer Elaina Satana adopted her stage surname as a tribute to Tura Satana.
 She appears in the painting titled, A Doorway to Whitney by Joe Coleman.
 In 2010, British band Dustaphonics released their first LP on Dirty Water Records featuring the song "Tura Satana" wrote in 2009 by Time Out London's journalist Simone Baird and Yvan Serrano-Fontova (Healer Selecta).
 Satana wrote "Burlesque Queen" for the Dustaphonics, the Londoners recorded the song and Dirty Water released the single in 2009, published by Wipeout Publishing UK 2009.
 London's based musician and DJ Healer Selecta recorded in 2008 "Tura Stomp" for the British Funk-Soul label Freestyle Records/Kudos publishing.
 Coffee brand Catfight Coffee, owned by Misfits and Dope member Acey Slade, has a coffee blend named after Tura Satana.

Further reading 

 Chapter 1 features Tura Satana.

 Features a 27-page interview with Tura Satana illustrated with photographs.

References

External links 

Official website

Roger Ebert on Satana
Varla Films

1938 births
2011 deaths
American burlesque performers
American female erotic dancers
American erotic dancers
American film actresses
American vedettes
Japanese-American internees
People from Hokkaido
Japanese emigrants to the United States
American actresses of Filipino descent
American dancers of Asian descent
American people of Cheyenne descent
American people of Scotch-Irish descent
20th-century American women
21st-century American women